River Park Square is a shopping mall and entertainment complex in Spokane, Washington. The shopping center was originally opened in 1974. Following years of decline, the center was redeveloped in 1999 using public and private funds in an effort to revitalize downtown Spokane. The mall, still privately owned by Cowles Company, is anchored by Nordstrom and contains an outpost of AMC Theatres.

History
The original River Park Square was opened in 1974. In 1978, an expansion added a 55,000 square-foot enclosed second level and two skywalks connecting the mall to the JCPenney and Nordstrom stores. When completed, the shopping center contained 800,000 square-feet of retail space with The Crescent, JCPenney, and Nordstrom as anchor stores. In February 1984, a new skywalk was constructed to connect the center to The Bon Marché, which was located east of the complex. The addition of the skywalk added 20,000 square-foot of retail space to the center.

In January 1987, Osco Drug closed its drug store at the shopping mall. The drug store, which previously operated as PayLess Drug and Skaggs, had been located in downtown Spokane since 1942. The space was quickly replaced by Thrifty Drug in November 1987. In April 1994, PayLess Drug, which acquired the pharmacy from Thrifty, closed for good.

In 1991, JCPenney closed its store at River Park Square after relocating to the newly renovated NorthTown Mall. Burlington Coat Factory moved into the space in 1994 and remained at the mall until moving to a larger location in 2001. In April 1992, the shopping mall suffered a big loss when Frederick & Nelson, which acquired The Crescent in 1988, liquidated and closed its remaining stores.

In 1995, the Spokane City Council announced that it would seek a $23.8 million federal loan to build a larger Nordstrom store in an attempt bring shoppers back to the ailing shopping center. On February 12, 1998, Nordstrom signed a 20-year lease on a new building at River Park Square. Construction began in April 1998. The old Nordstrom building was demolished shortly after for new retail space. The redeveloped $110 million shopping center opened on August 20, 1999 to a crowd of about 2,000 people.

The mall has expanded in the 2010s with the acquisition of the Saad building in 2015 on the corner of Main and Wall Street being replaced with a 10,000 square foot Urban Outfitters location and in the spring of 2016 with the acquisition of the shuttered Macy's building across from Wall Street, which was converted into luxury apartments with first floor retail. A Nike Factory Store became the tenant in the new 12,000 square foot retail portion of the building, now called “The M” in reference to the buildings former tenants, The Bon Marché and Macy's. A Flatstick Pub was added as an additional tenant in 2019.

Being an urban, mixed use mall has been beneficial to it. Its proximity to other foot traffic generating attractions such as Riverfront Park, a public library, and eateries and having a revenue generating parking garage downtown has allowed River Park Square to weather a deteriorating retail outlook that has challenged suburban outlet malls; River Park Square's customer base is also more recession resistant as it has more high end luxury stores such as an Apple store and Nordstrom than do typical outlet malls.

References

External links

 River Park Square Official Site

Cowles Company
Buildings and structures in Spokane, Washington
Shopping malls established in 1974
1974 establishments in Washington (state)
Shopping malls in Washington (state)